EUCOR is a tri-national association of five universities in the Upper Rhine region with two universities from Germany, two from France, and one from Switzerland. It was originally founded in 1989 and was reorganised as a European Grouping of Territorial Cooperation (EGTC) in 2015.

Members
In 2019, the consortium includes about 117,000 students, 15,000 teachers, and researchers and 13,500 doctoral students, a large number of faculties, institutes and laboratories in almost all fields with a total annual budget of more than 2.3 billion euros. EUCOR members are:

 Karlsruhe Institute of Technology (KIT), Germany
 University of Freiburg, Germany
 University of Strasbourg, France
 University of Upper Alsace (UHA), France
 University of Basel, Switzerland

References

External links
 Official website
 EUCOR on Twitter

College and university associations and consortia in Europe
Organizations established in 1989
University of Freiburg
Karlsruhe Institute of Technology
University of Strasbourg
University of Upper Alsace
University of Basel